Andjelo or Anđelo Rudović (born 3 May 1996), is a Montenegrin professional footballer who plays as an attacking midfielder or winger for Mohammedan in the I-League.

Club career
Born in Ulcinj, Rudović started playing football with Otrant in his home town at the age of 6. Later he moved to Mornar Bar, where he stayed for two years. Finally, he joined Mogren where he ended his youth career and made his first senior appearances with the club in 2013. Rudović signed a one-year deal with PSV Eindhoven in 2014. As a club member, he usually played with reserves, making his professional debut for Jong PSV player in the second division on 19 September 2014 in a 0–2 home defeat against Sparta Rotterdam. After the end of contract he left the club in summer 2015, after which he joined Mladost Podgorica. Making 29 appearances with 2 goals at total in both domestic competitions mostly as a back-up player, Rudović contributed to winning the Montenegrin First League for 2015–16 season. Next summer, he left the club and moved to OFK Petrovac.

On 17 August 2017, Rudović signed with the Serbian SuperLiga side Spartak Subotica, peening a three-year professional contract with new club. Making a single appearance with a goal in the Serbian Cup match against Polet Lipljan, Rudović released by the club in December same year. At the beginning of 2018, Rudović signed with Kom.

On 12 November 2021, Rudović moved to India and joined I-League side Mohammedan Sporting ahead of the team's Calcutta Football League final against Railway FC. On 18 November, Mohammedan clinched their 12th Calcutta Football League title after forty long years, defeating Railway FC 1–0, in which Rudović played a key role.

He scored his first league goal for Mohammedan on 8 March 2022 against Sreenidi Deccan in their 3–1 win. Under Nikola Stojanović's captaincy, Mohammedan for the first time, ran for their maiden national league title in 2021–22 I-League season, but finished as runners-up after a 2–1 defeat to Gokulam Kerala at the end.

International career
Rudović represented Montenegro under-17 and under-19 level.

Career statistics

Club

Honours
Mladost Podgorica
Montenegrin First League: 2015–16
Mohammedan Sporting
Calcutta Football League: 2021
I-League runner-up: 2021–22

References

External links
 Andjelo Rudović stats at sport1.de
 
 
 
 

1996 births
Living people
People from Ulcinj
Association football midfielders
Montenegrin footballers
Montenegro youth international footballers
FK Mogren players
PSV Eindhoven players
Jong PSV players
OFK Titograd players
OFK Petrovac players
FK Spartak Subotica players
FK Kom players
FK Dečić players
Montenegrin First League players
Eerste Divisie players
Montenegrin expatriate footballers
Expatriate footballers in the Netherlands
Montenegrin expatriate sportspeople in the Netherlands
Expatriate footballers in Serbia
Montenegrin expatriate sportspeople in Serbia
Expatriate footballers in India
Montenegrin expatriate sportspeople in India
Mohammedan SC (Kolkata) players